Arvo Nuut (13 April 1941 – 1 March 2021) was an Estonian film operator and film producer.

Since 1961 he worked at Tallinnfilm's puppetry department; being 1964-1989 an operator, 1989-1992 a producer. 1992-2013 he was the head and producer of OÜ Nukufilm.

In total he produced 57 animated films.

In 2006 he was awarded the Order of the White Star, V class.

Filmography

 2010 "Taevalaul"
 2011 "Keha mälu"
 2011 "Prohveti sünd"
 2012 "Kolmnurga afäär"

References

1941 births
2021 deaths
Estonian cinematographers
Estonian film producers
Recipients of the Order of the White Star, 5th Class